Lucky Girl is a 1932 British musical comedy film directed by Gene Gerrard and Frank Miller and starring Gerrard, Molly Lamont and Gus McNaughton. It was made at Elstree Studios with sets designed by the art director John Mead. It was based on a play titled Mr. Abdullah.

Plot summary

A young English-raised former army officer inherits the throne of a small European kingdom. Bored by life there and wishing to raise funds for his impoverished country by selling the crown jewels, he travels to London with his American efficiency expert. Invited to a house party, he travels there incognito but having fallen in love with the daughter of his host he becomes the prime suspect for a robbery that has taken place.

Cast
 Gene Gerrard as Stephan Gregorovitch  
 Molly Lamont as Lady Moira  
 Gus McNaughton as Hudson E. Greener 
 Spencer Trevor as Duke Hugo  
 Toni Edgar-Bruce as Duchess Amelia  
 Hal Gordon as Police Constable  
 Frank Stanmore as Mullins 
 Ian Fleming as Lord Henry

References

Bibliography
 Low, Rachael. Filmmaking in 1930s Britain. George Allen & Unwin, 1985.
 Wood, Linda. British Films, 1927–1939. British Film Institute, 1986.

External links

1932 films
British musical comedy films
1932 musical comedy films
Films shot at British International Pictures Studios
Films directed by Frank Miller (screenwriter)
Films directed by Gene Gerrard
Films set in London
British black-and-white films
1930s English-language films
1930s British films